
The following lists events that happened during 1810 in South Africa.

Events
Saartjie Baartman, the "Hottentot Venus", departs Cape Town for London.

References
See Years in South Africa for list of References

History of South Africa